Tadeusz Piotrowski or Thaddeus Piotrowski (born 10 February 1940) is a Polish-American sociologist and author. He is a professor of sociology in the Social Science Division of the University of New Hampshire at Manchester in Manchester, New Hampshire.

Early life and education
Born in the region of Volhynia in occupied Poland, Piotrowski and his family left in August 1943. He earned his PhD in sociology from the University of Pennsylvania in 1973.

Career
Piotrowski taught courses at the University of New Hampshire in anthropology and the Holocaust.

Piotr Wróbel considers Piotrowski's works to be "highly polemical and controversial", similar to those by Richard C. Lukas and Marek Jan Chodakiewicz. According to Ukrainian historian Andrii Bolianovskyi, Piotrowski's studies on the Ukrainian-Polish ethnic conflicts rely unilaterally on the way they were conceived and presented by Polish right-wing politicians and the underground press during World War II.

Poland's Holocaust 

Poland’s Holocaust: Ethnic Strife, Collaboration with Occupying Forces and Genocide in the Second Republic, 1918–1947, first published in 1998, concerns the topic of Poland's history in the interwar period as well as in World War II, with particular focus on the uneasy relations between various ethnic groups of the Second Polish Republic.

Klaus-Peter Friedrich writing in Zeitschrift für Ostmitteleuropa-Forschung criticized the work as an "apologetic" tract. Jan Grabowski characterized the book as a "collection of quotations taken out of context"; it put forward multiple ahistorical claims. Gwido Zlatkes, reviewing the work for Polin: Studies in Polish Jewry, criticized the work for being biased towards the Poles; throughout the work, Piotrowski's "polemical passion" shared an uncomfortable relationship with "scholarly discipline." Jeremy Black found the work to be a "seriously unbalanced account" that had "hijacked" the terminology of Holocaust to include victims of Soviet regime and portray the Jews as colloborators. In contrast, Anna M. Cienciala who reviewed the work for Nationalities Papers, described it as "a solid study of the suffering, resistance, and collaboration."

Genocide and Rescue in Wolyn 
Genocide and Rescue in Wolyn, first published in 2000, concerns the topic of massacres of Poles in Volhynia and Eastern Galicia during WWII. Bogdan Musiał, reviewing for Zeitschrift für Ostmitteleuropa-Forschung in 2001, found it to be an unbiased and informative work; however, there was a lack of engagement with the historical and political context of the events.

The Polish Deportees of World War II 
The Polish Deportees of World War II, first published in 2004, concerns the topic of mass deportations of Poles following the Soviet invasion and occupation of Eastern Poland in 1939. Anna Jaroszynska-Kirchmann in her review of this book for the Journal of Cold War Studies wrote that the book is "an excellent teaching tool" that "will likely be of great interest" to scholars interested in either modern history of that region or the topic of forced migrations. Gifford Malone, a US diplomat writing in History: Reviews of New Books, found the volume to be a well written and moving account.

Selected works
Piotrowski's major books include:
 Vengeance of the Swallows: Memoir of a Polish Family's Ordeal Under Soviet Aggression, Ukrainian Ethnic Cleansing and Nazi Enslavement, and Their Emigration to America (1995), McFarland & Company, 
 Poland's Holocaust (1998, 2006), McFarland, 
 Genocide and Rescue in Wolyn (2000, 2009), McFarland, 
 The Indian Heritage of New Hampshire and Northern New England (2002, 2009), McFarland, 
 The Polish Deportees of World War II (2004, 2008), McFarland, .

Awards
 The Cultural Achievement Award from the American Council for Polish Culture
 The Literary Award of the Polish Sociocultural Centre of the Polish Library in London
 Gold Medal Award for "promoting Polish history and culture", bestowed by the American Institute of Polish Culture at the 35th International Polonaise Ball in Miami.

References 

1940 births
American sociologists
Polish emigrants to the United States
Living people
University of Pennsylvania alumni
Saint Francis University alumni
University of New Hampshire faculty
Polish sociologists
People from Volyn Oblast